Seyyedin or Sedeyyen may refer to:
 Seyyedin 1
 Seyyedin 2